Hasan al-Kabir al-Gaddafi is the cousin of Muammar Gaddafi, and was the leader of the Revolutionary Guard Corps, that protected Gaddafi until his death and the overthrow of his regime in the Libyan Civil War.

References

Living people
Hasan
People of the First Libyan Civil War
Year of birth missing (living people)